Two ships of the United States Navy have been named Capable.

 , was a minesweeper launched 16 November 1942, and commissioned 5 December 1943. Capable was decommissioned 16 August 1945 and transferred to the Soviet Union under lend-lease.
 , is an Ocean Surveillance Ship, launched on 28 October 1988.

United States Navy ship names